Li Weiliang (born 2 September 1980 in Beijing, China) is a Chinese baseball player. He was a member of Team China at the 2008 Summer Olympics.

Sports career
1997 Beijing Municipal Baseball Team B;
1998 Beijing Municipal Team;
2000 National Youth Team;
2003 National Team

Major performances
1998 National Championship - 1st;
1999 National Champions Tournament - 1st;
2001/2005 National Games - 3rd/2nd;
2003 National Intercity Games - 1st;
2003-2005 National League - 1st;
2005 Asian Championship - 3rd

References
Profile 2008 Olympics Team China

1980 births
Living people
Baseball players at the 2008 Summer Olympics
2009 World Baseball Classic players
Chinese baseball players
Olympic baseball players of China
Baseball players from Beijing